Bless Them That Curse You is a collaborative album between Locrian and Mamiffer. The first single off the album, "In Fulminic Blaze", was released digitally on January 5, 2012.

Background
In an interview with Invisible Oranges, André Foisy stated that Mamiffer’s Aaron Turner invited Locrian to play shows and collaborate after the Utech Records festival in June 2012. The groups found support for the collaborative project from the Canadian Profound Lore record label.

In the same interview, Locrian’s Steven Hess stated that “Profound Lore was nice enough to advance us the money and pay for the recording sessions. Then everything went perfectly – the timing for everyone to come here, the festival” and the shows that the groups played together afterwards in the U.S. and Canada.

Regarding the recording session and the planning for the album, Mamiffer’s Faith Coloccia, in an interview with NPR, stated that “Everything came together, in a kind of synchronicity kind of way. We found connections between seemingly disparate sounds and images, and unified them into harmonious relationships.”

Reception
Upon its release, the album was met with generally favorable reviews. Eduardo Rivadavia of AllMusic described the collaboration as “powerful and seductive” and that “no song is safe from experiencing unexpected mutations or harboring antithetical sounds in both sublimely harmonious and intentionally disharmonic ways.” Alan Ranta of Exclaim described the album as a mix of tracks that “push towards the experimental side," and others that "drive towards post-rock and black metal.” PopMatters awarded the album an 8 out of 10 stars and described the album as having a “deeply meditative pulse” combining the “metallic drones, tender piano compositions, chorale vocals” of Mamiffer with Locrian’s mixture of “black metal, noise, drone, Krautrock, ambient and proto-electronica.” Creaig Dunton of Brainwashed described Bless Them That Curse You as “a dark, yet captivating set of tracks” which incorporate “bits of drone, black metal, post-rock, and gentle piano passages.”

Track listing

Personnel

Credits adapted from AllMusic.

 Alex Barnett – Mellotron, Synthesizer, Tack Piano
 Faith Coloccia –  Artwork, Composer, Design, Photography, Piano, Sampling, Synthesizer Bass, Tack Piano, Tape, Vocals
 Brian Cook – Bass
 Randall Dunn – Mixing, Overdub Engineer, Producer
 André Foisy – Guitar (Acoustic), Guitar (Electric)
 Terence Hannum – Composer, Effects, Mellotron, Synthesizer, Vocals
 Steven Hess – Drums, Tape Effects, Timpani
 Greg Norman – Engineer, Horn
 Travis Rommereim – Percussion
 Aaron Turner – Composer, Engineer, Guitar (Electric), Vocals
 Jason Ward – Mastering

References

External links 
 

2012 albums
Mamiffer albums
Locrian (band) albums
Collaborative albums
Profound Lore Records albums